The Grambling State Tigers women's basketball team represents Grambling State University in Grambling, Louisiana.  The school's team currently competes in the Southwestern Athletic Conference.

NCAA Division I Tournament appearances
The Tigers have appeared in six NCAA Division I Tournaments. They have a record of 0–6.

References

External links